The Office of Religious Freedom was an agency of Global Affairs Canada that was established by the Government of Canada on 19 February 2013 to monitor religious persecution and protect freedom of religion internationally. It closed on 31 March 2016. In 2021, the Deputy Leader of Conservative Party of Canada Candice Bergen called for the re-establishment of Office of Religious Freedom in Canada to help address issues like the forced conversion of minority girls in Pakistan.

History

Canadian Prime Minister Stephen Harper announced the Office of Religious Freedom as part of his political campaign during the 2011 federal election. A closed-door meeting about the office was criticized when it was discovered that of the six panellists consulted, four were Christian, one Jewish, and one Baháʼí. Harper denied the office would have a Christian bias. In response to claims of such a bias at the similar Office of International Religious Freedom in the United States, Harper stated that Canada is "a very different country".

The Office of Religious Freedom was officially opened on 19 February 2013 and Harper announced that Andrew P. W. Bennett, dean of Augustine College and a former civil servant, would be its first Ambassador for Religious Freedom.

On 31 March 2016 the Office of Religious Freedom was closed by the newly elected government of Prime Minister Justin Trudeau.

Mandate

The office's stated mandate was to:

protect, and advocate on behalf of, religious minorities under threat;
oppose religious hatred and intolerance; and
promote Canadian values of pluralism and tolerance abroad.

Criticism
The Office of Religious Freedom faced some criticism during its proposal and existence. Humanist Canada and the Centre for Inquiry Canada (CFIC) noted that no secular organizations were consulted about the creation of the office, nor were they invited to the official announcement of the new ambassador. Bob Rae, the then-interim Liberal leader, agreed that religious freedom is an important value but questioned how the office would fit into Canada's broader efforts to address human rights issues. A representative of the Canadian Council on American-Islamic Relations raised concerns as to whether the office was too Christian focused, since the person appointed to lead it was a Catholic.

Endorsement

Former British prime minister Tony Blair, a Roman Catholic, warmly endorsed the Office while in Ottawa in October 2013, "I think the very fact that Canada's taken the step to have an Office of Religious Freedom is a great sign. I think it shows leadership from Canada. And Canada, by the way, in many ways is a perfect place from which to promote this ideal because of the complexion of the country."

Effects
Harper stated that Chinese diplomats were upset that he had "singled out religious persecution in China" during his announcement of the establishment of the office.

In a 2013 Globe and Mail article by Steven Chase, Ambassador Bennett was quoted saying, "Freedom of religion includes the freedom not to have a particular religious faith ... I think that’s just logically consistent." The author continued, "[Ambassador Bennett] signalled his greatest priority would be believers. .. The vast majority of people being persecuted are people of faith. They are the ones that are being killed. They are the ones that are facing legislative and regulatory restrictions."

See also

Foreign policy of the Stephen Harper government
Freedom of religion in Canada

References

Sources

External links

2013 establishments in Canada
2016 disestablishments in Canada
Former Canadian federal departments and agencies
Government agencies established in 2013
Government agencies disestablished in 2016
Government of Canada
Freedom of religion in Canada